707 Naval Air Squadron (707 NAS) was a Naval Air Squadron of the Royal Navy's Fleet Air Arm.

Aircraft operated
The squadron operated a variety of different aircraft and versions:
 Fairey Swordfish II & III
 Fairey Barracuda II & III
 Avro Anson I
 Grumman Avenger III
 Westland Wessex HU.5
 Westland Sea King HC.4

References

Citations

Bibliography

700 series Fleet Air Arm squadrons
Military units and formations established in 1945
Air squadrons of the Royal Navy in World War II